59th Street/University of Chicago is a railway station that serves the Metra Electric Line in Chicago, Illinois. The station is on 59th street, originally the University of Chicago's southern border, and the Midway Plaisance. Trains run between Millennium Station downtown and University Park, Blue Island, and the Chicago neighborhood of South Chicago. As of 2018, the station is the 63rd busiest of Metra's 236 non-downtown stations, with an average of 812 weekday boardings. Before the 55th-56th-57th Street Station to the immediate north was rebuilt into a major station in 2002, all express trains served 59th Street and the station had a staffed ticket window.

The majority of University of Chicago and Hyde Park traffic is now served by the 57th Street Station; only some express trains stop at 59th Street.

Bus connections
CTA
  2 Hyde Park Express  
  6 Jackson Park Express  
  15 Jeffery Local  
  28 Stony Island

References

External links

Former Illinois Central Railroad stations
Metra stations in Chicago
University of Chicago
Railway stations in Illinois at university and college campuses